Clara Marie Iemma (born 31 October 1998) is an Australian cricketer. She is an all-rounder who bats left-handed and bowls right-arm off break. She has played four List A matches for the Australian Capital Territory in the Women's National Cricket League (WNCL). She signed a one-year deal with the Sydney Sixers in 2017; however, injury prevented her from making a WBBL appearance.

Iemma was born in Beverly Hills, Sydney. She is the eldest child of former Labor politician Morris Iemma, who served as premier of New South Wales from 2005 to 2008.

References

External links
 
 

1998 births
Living people
Australian cricketers
Australian women cricketers
ACT Meteors cricketers
Cricketers from Sydney
Sportswomen from New South Wales
Australian people of Calabrian descent